SNES Mini or Mini SNES may refer to:

New-Style Super NES, a redesign of the original Super Nintendo Entertainment System (SNES), released in 1997
Super NES Classic Edition, a microconsole based on the Super Nintendo Entertainment System, released in 2017